Stan Brown may refer to:

Sportspeople
 Stan Brown (Australian footballer) (1921–1994), Australian rules footballer
 Stan Brown (basketball) (1929–2009), American basketball player
 Stanley Brown (cricketer, born 1877) (1877–1952), English cricketer
 Stanley Brown (cricketer, born 1907) (1907–1978), English cricketer
 Stan Brown (English footballer) (1941–2018), English footballer
 Stan Brown (ice hockey) (1898–1987), Canadian ice hockey defenceman

Others
 Stan! (Steven Brown, born 1964), American author, sometimes credited as Stan Brown
 Stan Brown (actor), who appeared in the 2005 film Almost Normal
 Stanley Brown (actor), who appeared in the 1941 film Harvard, Here I Come
 Stanley Brown (engineer) (1910–1997), English mechanical and electrical engineer
 Stanley Brown, a character in the 1950 film State Penitentiary